The Reliance-class fast patrol vessels are a series of fourteen fast patrol vessels being built by Reliance Defence and Engineering, Pipavav, Gujarat for the Indian Coast Guard. The ships of this class have a medium surface range and are capable of operations in maritime zones of India.

Description 
In January 2017, Reliance Defence and Engineering won the contract to build fourteen ships for $137.68 million. The ships in this class are water jet propelled and have a speed of 33 knots. They are also equipped with a 30 mm CRN 91 Naval Gun and two 12.7 mm guns.

Ships of the class

References 

Patrol ship classes
Ships of the Indian Coast Guard
Indian Coast Guard